James Richard Kelly (born March 28, 1975) is an American filmmaker and screenwriter, who initially gained recognition for writing and directing the cult classic Donnie Darko in 2001.

Early life
Kelly was born James Richard Kelly in Newport News, Virginia, the son of Lane and Ennis Kelly. He grew up in Midlothian, Virginia, where he attended Midlothian High School and graduated in 1993. When he was a child, his father worked for NASA on the Mars Viking Lander program. He won a scholarship to the University of Southern California to study at the USC School of Cinema-Television where he was a member of the Phi Delta Theta fraternity. He made two short films at USC, The Goodbye Place and Visceral Matter, before graduating in 1997.

Kelly spoke of viewing the film Brazil with author Robert K. Elder in an interview for The Film That Changed My Life:

I think the greatest thing I learned from Terry is that every frame is worthy of attention to detail. Every frame is worthy of being frozen in time and then thrown on a wall like an oil painting, and if you work hard on every frame, the meaning of your film becomes deeper, more enhanced.

Film career
Donnie Darko (2001) was his first feature and was nominated for 21 awards, winning 11 of them, including a nomination for a Saturn Award. The film later ended up #2 on Empire magazine's list of the 50 greatest independent films of all time, behind Quentin Tarantino's Reservoir Dogs.

In 2005 Kelly wrote the screenplay for the Tony Scott-directed film, Domino. Kelly has said, "That was a wonderful experience. I wrote that for Tony Scott. That was Tony Scott's very personal project that he had spent eight years developing with Domino Harvey, a close friend of his and almost like a daughter to him. He had spent years trying to tell her story and so that for me, it was an honor for me to get to work with Tony and to write that script for him and to design this really elaborate puzzle for him to tell her story. So that was just a privilege."

Kelly has written numerous scripts that have not been produced, among them adaptations of Kurt Vonnegut's Cat's Cradle and Louis Sachar's Holes.

His fourth film, and second feature, Southland Tales, a rough cut of which screened in competition at the 2006 Cannes Film Festival, was released November 16, 2007 and stars Dwayne Johnson, Sarah Michelle Gellar, Seann William Scott, Kevin Smith and Miranda Richardson.

In 2008, Kelly's production company Darko Entertainment announced that it was producing the adaptation of the bestselling book I Hope They Serve Beer in Hell with director Bob Gosse. The book's author Tucker Max detailed Kelly's involvement in the process on his blog.

After the release of The Box, he said he was working on a thriller "set in Manhattan in the year 2014. We hope to shoot the movie in 3-D, and part of the movie would be filmed using full CGI motion capture." In 2011 he announced that he was writing and directing Corpus Christi, a Texas-set film to be produced by Eli Roth.
The production was cancelled due to financial and casting problems. Kelly stated that he would instead focus on a true-crime thriller titled Amicus which was set to star James Gandolfini; however, the movie went unmade following the actor's death in 2013.

In an interview with PopMatters magazine in 2017, Kelly said in regards to doing an official sequel to Donnie Darko, "I'm open to doing something much bigger and longer and more ambitious that could be a new story," Kelly said and then added, "We'll see what happens. I have a lot of stuff that I'm working on and it's ambitious and it's expensive and we'll see what happens." In regards to the 2009 Donnie Darko sequel S. Darko Kelly has said, "I had nothing to do with it. And I hate it when people try and blame me or hold me responsible for it because I had no [involvement]. I don't control the underlying rights to [the Donnie Darko franchise]. I had to relinquish them when I was 24 years old. I hate when people ask me about that because I've never seen it and I never will, so… don't ask me about the sequel."

Reception
In 2016, filmmaker Kevin Smith said of Kelly: "He is insanely creative and is not unlike Christopher Nolan. But Nolan wound up in the Warner Bros. system where he got special handling, and he got a lot of money to make huge art films like Inception. Richard can be one of our greatest filmmakers. He is right now, but just a lot of people don't realize it. He's still a kid, and someone needs to Nolan that kid."

Filmography

Films

Awards and nominations

Nominated
 2001 – Sundance Film Festival, Grand Jury Prize (Donnie Darko)
 2001 – Sitges – Catalan International Film Festival, Best Film (Donnie Darko)
 2002 – Online Film Critics Society Awards, OFCS Award (Donnie Darko)
 2002 – Independent Spirit Awards, Best First Feature (Donnie Darko)
 2002 – Independent Spirit Awards, Best First Screenplay (Donnie Darko)
 2002 – Chicago Film Critics Association Awards, Most Promising Director
 2006 – Cannes Film Festival, Palme d'Or (Southland Tales)

References

External links

1975 births
American film producers
American male screenwriters
Living people
Writers from Richmond, Virginia
USC School of Cinematic Arts alumni
Film directors from Virginia
Science fiction film directors
People from Newport News, Virginia
People from Midlothian, Virginia
Screenwriters from Virginia
Postmodernist filmmakers